The 2014–15 Winthrop Eagles men's basketball team represented Winthrop University during the 2014–15 NCAA Division I men's basketball season. The Eagles, led by third year head coach Pat Kelsey, played their home games at the Winthrop Coliseum and were members of the  Big South Conference. They finished the season 19–13, 12–6 in Big South play to finish in a three-way tie for third place. They advanced to the conference championship game of the Big South tournament where they lost to Coastal Carolina. Despite going to the championship game of their conference tournament, the Eagles didn't play in a postseason tournament.

Roster

Schedule

|-
!colspan=9 style="background:#8C2633; color:#FFD700;"| Regular season

|-
!colspan=9 style="background:#8C2633; color:#FFD700;"| Big South tournament

References

Winthrop Eagles men's basketball seasons
Winthrop
Winthrop Eagles men's basketball
Winthrop Eagles men's basketball